Thibodaux High School (THS) is a public high school serving students in grades 9–12 in Thibodaux, Louisiana, United States about 75 miles southwest of New Orleans. It is one of three high schools in the Lafourche Parish Public Schools.

It serves: Thibodaux, Ward 6 (including Chackbay and Choctaw), and Kraemer (a.k.a. Bayou Boeuf).

History
The school was founded circa 1908 at the site of what is now Thibodaux Elementary School. One of its first principals was L. L. Broussard. Later the school was moved a block away to the current site of East Thibodaux Middle School. In 1967, the student body was moved to its current location at the corner of Talbot Avenue and Tiger Drive.

In 1968 the high school for black students, C.M. Washington High School, was dissolved due to racial integration. Therefore black students now attended the previously all-white school.

In 2002, ninth grade students were added to the campus.

Athletics
Thibodaux High athletics competes in the LHSAA.

The school competes in several sports, including:

Baseball
Basketball
Cheerleading
Cross Country
Dance Team (Tigerettes)
Fishing
Football
Golf
Soccer
Softball
Swimming
Tennis
Track and Field
Volleyball

Championships
Football Championships
(1) State Championship: 1991

Thibodaux High won the class 5A football state championship in 1991 against Neville High School. The team under head coach Dennis Lorio won 18–15 in overtime becoming the first football team to win a class 5A football championship in LHSAA history.

Boys' basketball Championships
(1) State Championship: 2019

Thibodaux High boys' basketball team won the 5A state championship in 2019 against Walker High School.

Notable alumni
Eric Andolsek, offensive lineman for LSU Tigers and the NFL's Detroit Lions
Kody Chamberlain, a comic book creator
Mark Davis, Former NBA small forward 2nd round of 1995 pick #48 Minnesota Timberwolves
Ronald Dominique, serial killer
Damian Johnson, small forward for the Heatdevils (Japanese basketball).
Jerome "Dee" Richard, 1973 alumnus, current member of the Louisiana House of Representatives from Lafourche Parish, one of only two Independents in the chamber
Amik Robertson, NFL cornerback
Greg Robinson, offensive lineman for the Cleveland Browns
Tom Roussel, NFL linebacker
Scott Sanders, Former MLB player (San Diego Padres, Detroit Tigers, Seattle Mariners, Chicago Cubs)

References

External links
School website
School district website

Public high schools in Louisiana
Schools in Lafourche Parish, Louisiana
Thibodaux, Louisiana